This list includes notable companies with primary headquarters located in Malta. The industry and sector follow the Industry Classification Benchmark taxonomy. Organizations which have ceased operations are included and noted as defunct.

See also 
 Economy of Malta
 List of airlines of Malta
 List of hotels in Malta
 List of newspapers in Malta
 List of radio stations in Malta

References 

Malta